Lucy Fradkin (born 1953) is an American self-taught artist from New York who paints portraits which often include collage elements. She is inspired by Persian and Indian miniature paintings with bright palettes and flattened space as well as the ancient frescoes and mosaics of Etruria, Rome, and Byzantium. In addition, she visited the Brooklyn Museum as a young artist with her mother and was inspired by The Dinner Party by Judy Chicago, as a prominent piece of art by a living woman artist.

Biography

Early life 
Lucy Fradkin was  born in Brooklyn, New York. She was raised in Port Washington, on Manhasset Bay, on the north shore of Long Island. She spent many formative years in southern Vermont. Since the early 1990s,  travels to other cultures have had a profound  influence on her studies and artwork.  She has found great inspiration from the art of ancient and indigenous cultures of Latin America, Italy and Greece.   In 2002-2003, she spent a year living, working, exhibiting and lecturing in Italy. Based in Rome, she was able to travel extensively around the country further informing her work through a visual immersion into the art of ancient worlds.

Collections 

Fradkin's work has been represented within the permanent collection of notable galleries and museums including: "Lucy Fradkin, Home is Where the Heart is" at the Nancy Margolis Gallery, New York, 2012. She is included in the Viewing Program Artist Registry at The Drawing Center, New York; and her work "I Wish It Would Rain" was purchased by the Weatherspoon Art Museum, at the University of North Carolina at Greensboro, for their Dillard Collection of Art on Paper. Her work is in the University Hospitals Art Collection.

Fradkin's works "An Awakening To Other Orders of Reality" and "Birds of a Feather" are in the private collection of Agnes Gund, President Emerita of the Museum of Modern Art (MoMA) and were included in the movie "Aggie".

Notable Works 

Notable among Fradkin's works are “Arthur Dreams of India” 2014, and “An Awakening To Other Orders Of Reality”, 2010.

Like many of Fradkin's pieces, these paintings feature a full-frontal portrait of either an archetypal or actual individual. The subjects stand in the center of spaces that are described with flattened tiled floors or rugs, and patterned wall papers or curtains.  Objects sit, hang and float in these spaces and interact with the figures both abstractly as well as pictorially, resulting in an intimate visual narrative.

Fradkin's husband, the Jamaican-born artist Arthur Simms, features in many of Frandin's paintings, most notably “Arthur Dreams of India”. Included in the 2016 Outwin Boochever Portrait Exhibition at the National Portrait Gallery (United States), this work in acrylic gouache, collage, pencil, and metallic thread on paper, has a flat, folk sensibility. In this portrait, Fradkin has drawn on the traditions of Indian miniature painting to honor Arthur's mother, Icema, who, like others from Jamaica, might have been of Indian descent.

“An Awakening To Other Orders of Reality” (acrylic gouache on paper with collage and pencil) currently in the private collection of Agnes Gund, was included in the film Aggie. In this painting, two trays, one with a floral pattern and one with a portrait, are stacked behind and haloed around the head of the main figure. On either side of this totem are two squares that make window shapes and silhouette a house plant frond on one side and a Red-tailed Hawk on the other. An abundance of detail in the midst of "simply" rendered figures allows us to focus, play and ponder all the possible associations and rhythmic patterns between the various elements in the paintings.

Exhibitions  

Fradkin's work in portraiture has won significant critical attention. She was a three-time finalist for the Outwin Boochever Portrait Competition at the Smithsonian Museum National Portrait Gallery (United States) in Washington, DC (2016, 2013, 2006).

Her portraits were included in the 2008-2009 exhibition "As Others See Us: The Contemporary Portrait" at the Brattleboro Museum and Art Center, Brattleboro, VT. Frandkin's work was the subject of articles and reviews of the exhibition.

The Nicolaysen Art Museum, Casper, WY, had a solo show of Lucy Fradkin's work in 2008-2009, which included the notable work "Teatime With Arthur" (2005).

"Lucy Fradkin: A Brief History of Fashion and Friendship" (Kenise Barnes Fine Art, 2000) was the subject of a December 17, 2000, The New York Times Arts & Entertainment review.

Exhibitions List
 2021
 Tenacity, Chautaqua Institution, Chautaqua, NY
 7 Years, La Nueva FÁBRICA, Antigua, Guatemala  (postponed)
 2020
 Still Utopia:Islands, MC Gallery, New York, NY
 2019	
 New Work by Lucy Fradkin, Alleghany Meadows and Trey Hill, Harvey Preston Gallery, 						  ; Aspen, Colorado
 Every Woman Biennial, La Mama Galleria, New York, NY
 2018	
 Untitled, Miami, Steve Turner Gallery, Miami, FL
 Inside Out, Steve Turner, Los Angeles, CA
 American Portraiture Today, The Baker Museum, Naples, FL
 American Portraiture Today, Ackland Art Museum, Chapel Hill, NC
 2017
 American Portraiture Today, Kemper Museum of Contemporary Art, Kansas City, MO
 American Portraiture Today, Tacoma Art Museum, Tacoma, WA
 American Portraiture Today, Art Museum of South Texas, Corpus Christi, TX
 Whitney Houston Biennial, 325 West Broadway New York, NY
 2016
 American Portraiture Today, Smithsonian Museum National Portrait Gallery (United States), Washington, DC 
 David Kimball Anderson, Elizabeth Ferrill, Lucy Fradkin & Michaelene Walsh, Harvey/Meadows Gallery, Aspen, CO
 2014
 Lucy Fradkin and Arthur Simms: Intimate Worlds, Holter Museum of Art, Helena, MT
 Art on Paper, Weatherspoon Art Museum, Greensboro, NC
 Rule of the Law, Athens School of Fine Arts Gallery, Athens, Greece
 Flowering, Nancy Margolis Gallery, New York, NY
 2013
 Outwin Boochever Portrait Competition, Smithsonian Museum National Portrait Gallery, Washington, DC 
 Come Together: Surviving Sandy, Industry City, Brooklyn, NY
 Congregation Annotated, 106 Green Gallery, Brooklyn, NY
 Lucy Fradkin: Going To A Go-Go, “Harvey/Meadows Gallery, Aspen, CO	
 Lucy Fradkin Even Cowgirls Get the Blues,The Bellarmine Museum of Art (now Fairfield University Art Museum), Fairfield, CT
 2012 
 Lucy Fradkin-Home Is Where The Heart Is, Nancy Margolis Gallery New York, NY
 Lucy Fradkin and Roxa Smith, Kenise Barnes Fine Art, Larchmont, NY
 2011
 Lucy Fradkin, Tony Marsh, Sun Koo Yuh, Harvey/Meadows Gallery, Aspen, CO
 Rock, Paper, Scissors, Clark Gallery,  Lincoln, MA
 2010	
 Lucy Fradkin, Family Tree, Nancy Margolis Gallery New York, NY (solo)
 It's A Wonderful 10th, Sideshow Gallery, Brooklyn, NY
 2009
 Lucy Fradkin Terra Cotta, Terra Firma, Clark Gallery, Lincoln, MA (solo)
 Summer At The Paramount, Mulry Fine Art, Palm Beach, FL
 Party At Chris's House JANET KURNATOWSKI GALLERY Brooklyn, NY
 Flower Power, Clark Gallery Lincoln, MA
 2008–2009
 Lucy Fradkin Nicolayson Museum, Casper, WY (solo)
 As Others See Us, Brattleboro Museum and Art Center, Brattleboro, VT
 2008
 Lucy Fradkin Terra Cotta, Terra Firma, Clark Gallery, Lincoln, MA
 Family Portrait, Gallery San Angel, San Antonio, TX
 Fifteen Artists Address The Issue Of Love, Harvey/Meadows Gallery, Aspen, CO
 Rock, Scissors, Paper, Mulry Fine Art, West Palm Beach, FL
 2007
 Lucy Fradkin: Works on Paper, Harvey/Meadows Gallery, Aspen, CO (solo)
 Intricate Simplicity, Lucy Fradkin, Gallery San Angel, San Antonio, TX (solo)
 Lucy Fradkin, Lesley Heller Gallery, New York, NY (solo)
 Sugar Buzz, Lehman College of Art Gallery, Bronx, NY
 2006
 Outwin Boochever Portrait Competition, Smithsonian Museum National Portrait Gallery, Washington, DC
 3rd Wave, BAC Gallery Brooklyn, NY
 Art Bar Artists, Art Bar Gallery, Ithaca, NY
 Winter Salon, Lesley Heller Gallery, New York, NY
 A Thing of Beauty, Kenise Barnes Fine Art, Larchmont, NY
 2005
 Lucy Fradkin, Untold Stories” Kenise Barnes Fine Art Larchmont, NY (solo)
 2004
 Roman Holiday-New Work From A Year Spent In Rome-Lucy Fradkin and Arthur Simms, Kenise Barnes Fine Art (solo)
 ART Larchmont, NY (solo)
 2003
 Lucy Fradkin-Spring Line, American Academy in Rome, Rome, Italy (solo)

Personal life 
Fradkin is married to the Jamaican-born sculptor Arthur Simms.

Further reading

Articles, books and catalogues
 “American Portraiture Today”, SMITHSONIAN MUSEUM NATIONAL PORTRAIT GALLERY, 2016  
 “Exploring Studio Materials”, Mary Hafeli, Oxford University Press
  “Portrait Competition 2013”, SMITHSONIAN MUSEUM NATIONAL PORTRAIT GALLERY, 2013
 “ArtsObserver.com”, Lucy Fradkin Paints Charming Folk-Style Narrative Portraits, April 2012
 “ARTSlant”, Editor's Choice, Lucy Fradkin: Home Is Where The Heart Is, March 2012
 “Art in America” online, The Lookout, March 15, 2012
 “Hyperallergic”. A Wonderously Naïve Universe, March 20, 2012
 “ArtLog”, Pick of the Week, February 29, 2012
 “In the Morning” , Live Radio Interview,  WLIU, Southampton, NY, July 21, 2009
 “Artists on the Subjectivity and Objectivity of Looking”, Southern Vermont Arts Magazine, Winter 2009
 “As Others See Us”, Yankee Magazine, December 2008
 “It's All In How Things Are Projected”, The Boston Globe , November 26, 2008
 “Spotlight Focus”, The Keene Sentinel ,  November 26, 2008
 “Weekender”, Casper Star Tribune , October 17, 2008
 “Lucy Fradkin”,  Nicolaysen Art Museum, Lisa Hatchadoorian , October 2008
 “Sugar Buzz”,  New York Times, May 11, 2007
 “Portrait Competition 2006”, SMITHSONIAN MUSEUM NATIONAL PORTRAIT GALLERY, 2006
 “Portrait 21”  NATIONAL PORTRAIT GALLERY, Canberra, Australia  Spring 2006
 “Images That Capture Romance of Europe”, New York Times, February 15, 2004
 “American Academy in Rome 2002-2003”  (Video) Dantia MacDonald 2004 
 “Biennale di Arte Contemporanea di Porto Ercole 2003” (Catalog) August 2003
 “Italian Works:Lucy Fradkin e Arthur Simms”, Exibart, May 22, 2003
 
 “Contemporary Views”, New York Times, January 27, 2002
 
 “Self Taught Artists”, Mutts Magazine (Japan), August 2001
 
 “Drawing On Language”, SPACES, May 2001
 
 'Making Flat Statements', New York Times, December 17, 2000
 
 'New American Painting Number 32' , THE OPEN STUDIOS PRESS , February 2001
 
 'Through A Woman's Eyes',New York Times, November 19, 2000
 
 Cover , 'The Westchester County Times' , October 2000
 
 'Art: Pick of the Litter:' New York Press , December 16, 1998
 
 'Art Renaissance Speak Out', Channel 25, May 6, 1997
 
 'Video: Jun Sakamoto Meets NY Artists', Saga TV, November 1996
 
 'Pintura y collage de Lucy Fradkin', Siglo 21, 8 de Febrero 1996
 
 'La exposición de Lucy Fradkin se inaugura esta noche', Siglo 21, 9 de Febrero 1996
 
 'Bitácora de collages', Siglo 21, 9 de Febrero 1996
 
 'Days Without Art', Village Voice, January 18, 1994
 
 'Artistas en Residencia Otono '92', Fundacion Centro Cultural, 1992
 
 'Eric is Homeless', Lerner Publications Co., 1992
 
 'Dia de Los Muertos: Homelessness III' ALTERNATIVE MUSEUM, 1990
 
 'The Best of Annual Juried', THE QUEENS MUSEUM, March 1989
 
 '3-D Collage', Bangor Daily News', July 26, 1989
 
 'Review', New York Times, April 3, 1988
 
 'Column One',New York Times, December 18, 1986
 
 'Annual Juried', QUEENS MUSEUM, December 1985
 
 'By Artists for Artists', Newsday, October 18, 1985
 
 'Artists to Speak',Brattleboro Reformer, April 28, 1982
 
 'Vermont Visions', BRATTLEBORO MUSEUM, April 1982
 
 'Lucy Fradkin: Paper-Weavings', Art New England, February, 1982
 
 'Fradkin's Paper-Weavings',Brattleboro Reformer, January 27, 1982

References

American women artists
Living people
1953 births
21st-century American women